Torenia travancorica is a species of flowering plant belonging the family Linderniaceae, seen in evergreen forests and grasslands of the Western Ghats.

Description 
Torenia travancorica is a creeping herb with four-angled slender stems. leaves are ovate, acjminate with rounded base. There are 5–7 pairs of nerves and 1 cm long petiole. Tubular, narrowly winged flowers are axillary. Corolla tube is yellow and lobes are deep blue. Pitted pale brown seeds are seen in 2cm long capsule.

References 

Linderniaceae
Flora of India